Ilias Polatidis (c. 1966 – 16 April 2016) was a Greek politician. He was a member of the Popular Orthodox Rally.

Polatidis was born in Lefkonas, Serres. He studied mechanical engineering at the Aristotle University of Thessaloniki.

Polatidis was a member of the Popular Orthodox Rally since 2001.

Polatidis was a candidate MP in the 2004 and in 2007 parliamentary elections in Serres, where he got elected.

References

External links
Official website

1966 births
2016 deaths
Greek MPs 2007–2009
Popular Orthodox Rally politicians
Rensselaer Polytechnic Institute alumni
Greek MPs 2009–2012
People from Lefkonas